This is a timeline of women rabbis.

 

 Pre-modern figures
 1590–1670: Asenath Barzani is considered the first female rabbi of Jewish history by some scholars.
 1805–1888 Hannah Rachel Verbermacher (the Maiden of Ludmir) was the only independent female Rebbe in the history of Hasidism.
 1800s?: Malka of Trisk, de facto leader of a Hasidic community in Trisk.
 1800s?-1939: Sarah Horowitz-Sternfeld, known as the Khentshiner Rebbetzin, based in Chęciny, Poland, described as a de facto Hasidic leader.
 Modern figures
 1875: Miss Julia Ettlinger (1863-1890), the first female student at Hebrew Union College.
 1890s: Lena Aronsohn of Hot Springs, Arkansas set out to become a rabbi by providing public lectures to the Jewish community in Shreveport, Louisiana to earn enough money to pursue her rabbinical training at Hebrew Union College.
 1890s: Ray Frank, a young Jewish woman living on the American frontier, began delivering sermons in her small Jewish community in the American West. Frank was regarded at the time as the "first woman rabbi".
 1935: In Germany, Regina Jonas was ordained privately and became the world's first ordained female rabbi.
 1970s:
 1972: American Sally Priesand became America's first female rabbi ordained by a rabbinical seminary, and the second formally ordained female rabbi in Jewish history, after Regina Jonas.
 1974: American Sandy Eisenberg Sasso became the first female rabbi ordained in Reconstructionist Judaism.
 1975: Jackie Tabick, born in Dublin, became the first female rabbi in Britain.
 1975: The Women's Rabbinic Network, an American national organization for female Reform rabbis, was founded in 1975 by female rabbinic students.
 1976: Jackie Tabick became the first woman rabbi to have a child.
 1976: Michal Mendelsohn became the first presiding female rabbi in a North American congregation when she was hired by Temple Beth El Shalom in San Jose, California.
 1976: Rabbi Ilene Schneider, Ed.D., graduated from the Reconstructionist Rabbinical College in Philadelphia and was one of the first six female rabbis ordained in the United States.
 1977: American Sandy Eisenberg Sasso and her husband Dennis Sasso became the first couple to serve jointly as rabbis when they were hired by Beth-El Zedeck in Indianapolis.
 1979: Linda Joy Holtzman became the first woman to serve as a rabbi for a Conservative congregation when she was hired by Beth Israel Congregation of Chester County, which was then located in Coatesville, Pennsylvania. She had graduated in 1979 from the Reconstructionist Rabbinical College in Philadelphia, yet was hired by Beth Israel despite their being a Conservative congregation.
 1980s:
 1980: Joan Friedman became the first woman to serve as a rabbi in Canada in 1980, when she was appointed as an Assistant Rabbi at Holy Blossom Temple  in Toronto. Her appointment was followed shortly after by that of Elyse Goldstein as Assistant Rabbi from 1983 to 1986; Goldstein has been noted as the first female rabbi in Canada, but that is incorrect. 
 1981: American Helene Ferris became the first second-career female rabbi.
 1981: American Lynn Gottlieb became the first female rabbi in Jewish Renewal.
 1981: American Bonnie Koppell became the first female rabbi to serve in the U.S. military. She joined the army reserves in 1978 while a rabbinical student at the Reconstructionist Rabbinical College in Philadelphia, Pennsylvania, and was ordained in 1981.
 1981: Karen Soria, born and ordained in the United States, became Australia's first female rabbi.

 1984: From 1984 to 1990 Barbara Borts, born in America, was a rabbi at Radlett Reform Synagogue, making her the first woman rabbi to have a pulpit of her own in a UK Reform Judaism synagogue.
 1985: American Amy Eilberg became the first female rabbi ordained in Conservative Judaism.
 1986: Amy Perlin became the first female rabbi in America to start her own congregation, Temple B'nai Shalom in Fairfax Station, which she was the founding rabbi of in 1986.
 1986: Rabbi Julie Schwartz became the first female active-duty Naval chaplain in the U.S.
 1987: American Joy Levitt became the first female president of the Reconstructionist Rabbinical Association.
 1988: American Stacy Offner became the first openly lesbian rabbi hired by a mainstream Jewish congregation (Shir Tikvah in Minneapolis).
 1989: Einat Ramon, ordained in New York, became the first female native-Israeli rabbi.
 1990s:
 1990: Pauline Bebe became the first female rabbi in France.
 1992: Naamah Kelman, born in the United States, became the first female rabbi ordained in Israel.
 1992: American rabbi Karen Soria became the first female rabbi to serve in the U.S. Marines, which she did from 1992 until 1996.
 1993: Rebecca Dubowe became the first Deaf woman to be ordained as a rabbi in the United States.
 1993: Valerie Stessin, born in France, became the first woman to be ordained as a Conservative rabbi in Israel, as well as the first woman to be ordained by the Schechter Institute of Jewish Studies.
 1993: Maya Leibovich became the first native-born female rabbi in Israel; she was ordained in 1993 at the Hebrew Union College-Jewish Institute of Religion in Jerusalem.

 1993: Ariel Stone became the first American rabbi to lead a congregation in the former Soviet Union, and the first progressive rabbi to serve the Jewish community in Ukraine. 
 1993: Chana Timoner became the first female rabbi to hold an active duty assignment as a chaplain in the U.S. Army.
 1994: Analia Bortz became the first female rabbi ordained in Argentina at the Seminario Rabinico Latinoamericano Marshall T. Meyer.
 1994: Rabbi Laura Geller became the first woman to lead a major metropolitan congregation in the United States, specifically Temple Emanuel in Beverly Hills.
 1995: Dianne Cohler-Esses became the first Syrian woman to become a rabbi, and the first Syrian non-Orthodox rabbi, when she was ordained by the Jewish Theological Seminary of America in 1995.
 1995: Bea Wyler, born in Switzerland, who had studied at the Jewish Theological Seminary of America in New York, became the first female rabbi in postwar Germany, in the city of Oldenburg.
 1996: Cynthia Culpeper became the first pulpit rabbi to announce being diagnosed with AIDS, which she did when she was rabbi of Agudath Israel in Montgomery, Alabama.
 1997: Chava Koster became the first female rabbi from the Netherlands.
 1999: American Tamara Kolton became the very first rabbi of either sex in Humanistic Judaism.
 2000s:
 2000: Helga Newmark, born in Germany, became the first female Holocaust survivor ordained as a rabbi. She was ordained in America.

 2001: Angela Warnick Buchdahl, born in Korea, became the first Asian-American rabbi.
 2001: Eveline Goodman-Thau  became the first female rabbi in Austria.
 2002: American rabbi Pamela Frydman became the first female president of OHALAH (Association of Rabbis for Jewish Renewal.)
 2002: Jacqueline Mates-Muchin was ordained by Hebrew Union College-Jewish Institute of Religion in New York, and thus became the first Chinese-American rabbi.
 2003: Séverine Sokol became the second French female rabbi. She received her ordination from the Leo Baeck College - Centre for Jewish Education, becoming the second French woman (and the first French woman fully of North African Sephardic origins) to have been ordained in Reform Jewish history. While she conducted services and taught in synagogues in the French-speaking world, she only served congregations in England and in the United States.
 2003: Rabbi Janet Marder was named the first female president of the Reform Movement's Central Conference of American Rabbis (CCAR) on March 26, 2003, making her the first woman to lead a major rabbinical organization and the first woman to lead any major Jewish co-ed religious organization in the United States.
 2003: Sandra Kochmann, born in Paraguay, became the first female rabbi in Brazil.
 2003: Tsipi Gabai became the first woman from Morocco to be ordained as a rabbi.
 2003: Sarah Schechter became the first female rabbi in the U.S. Air Force.
 2003: Sivan Malkin Maas became the first Israeli ordained by the International Institute for Secular Humanistic Judaism in 2003.
 2004: Barbara Aiello, born in the United States, became the first female rabbi in Italy.

 2005: Floriane Chinsky, born in France, became Belgium's first female rabbi. 
 2005: Elisa Klapheck, born in Germany, became the first female rabbi in the Netherlands.
 2006: Dina Najman, ordained by Rabbi Daniel Sperber, became the first woman to lead an Orthodox synagogue, Kehilat Orach Eliezer, using the title "rosh kehilah."
 2006: Chaya Gusfield and Rabbi Lori Klein, both ordained in America, became the first openly lesbian rabbis ordained by the Jewish Renewal movement.

 2007: Tanya Segal, born in Russia, became the first full-time female rabbi in Poland.
 2008: Rabbi Julie Schonfeld was named the new executive vice president of the Conservative movement's Rabbinical Assembly, becoming the first female rabbi to serve in the chief executive position of an American rabbinical association.
 2009: Lynn Feinberg became the first female rabbi in Norway, where she was born.
 2009: Karen Soria, born in America, became the first female rabbi in the Canadian Forces; she was assigned to the 3 Canadian Forces Flying Training School in Portage la Prairie, Manitoba.

 2009: Alysa Stanton, born in Cleveland and ordained by a Reform Jewish seminary in Cincinnati, became the world's first black female rabbi. Later in 2009 she began work as a rabbi at Congregation Bayt Shalom, a small majority-white synagogue in Greenville, North Carolina, making her the first African-American rabbi to lead a majority-white congregation.
 2009: Sara Hurwitz was ordained by Rabbi Daniel Sperber and Rabbi Avraham Weiss, making her the first woman to receive Orthodox ordination. She immediately founded Yeshivat Maharat to offer ordination to more Orthodox women.  Maharat is an acronym for "Morah Hilchatit Ruchanut Toranit", which literally translated as  "Torah-based, spiritual teacher according to Jewish law". 

 2010s:
 2010: Alina Treiger, born in Ukraine, became the first female rabbi to be ordained in Germany since World War II.
 2011: Antje Deusel became the first German-born woman to be ordained as a rabbi in Germany since the Nazi era. She was ordained by Abraham Geiger College.
 2011: American Rachel Isaacs became the first openly lesbian rabbi ordained by the Conservative Jewish movement's Jewish Theological Seminary of America.
 2011: Sandra Kviat became the first female rabbi from Denmark; she was ordained in England.
 2012: Ilana Mills was ordained, thus making her, Jordana Chernow-Reader, and Mari Chernow the first three female siblings in America to become rabbis.
 2012: Alona Lisitsa became the first female rabbi in Israel to join a religious council. Although Leah Shakdiel, who was not a rabbi, joined the Yerucham religious council in 1988 after a Supreme Court decision in her favor, no female rabbi had joined a religious council until Lisitsa joined Mevasseret Zion's in 2012. She was appointed to the council three years before that, but the Religious Affairs Ministry delayed approving her appointment until Israel's High Court of Justice ordered it to.
 2012: American Emily Aviva Kapor, who had been ordained privately by a "Conservadox" rabbi in 2005, began living as a woman in 2012, thus becoming the first openly transgender female rabbi.
 2014: American rabbi Deborah Waxman was inaugurated as the president of the Reconstructionist Rabbinical College and Jewish Reconstructionist Communities on October 26, 2014. As the president of the Reconstructionist Rabbinical College, she is believed to be the first woman and first lesbian to lead a Jewish congregational union, and the first female rabbi and first lesbian to lead a Jewish seminary; the Reconstructionist Rabbinical College is both a congregational union and a seminary.
 2014: American rabbi Judith Hauptman became the first guest lecturer from abroad to address the Israeli Knesset’s weekly religious study session.
 2015: Ute Steyer became the first female rabbi in Sweden.
 2015: Mira Rivera became the first Filipino-American woman to be ordained as a rabbi.
 2015: Lila Kagedan, born in Canada, became the first graduate of Yeshivat Maharat to use the title "Rabbi". She officially became the first female Modern Orthodox rabbi in the United States of America when the Modern Orthodox Mount Freedom Jewish Center in Randolph, New Jersey hired her as a spiritual leader in January 2016.

 2015: Abby Stein came out as transgender and thus became the first woman (and the first openly transgender woman) to have been ordained by an ultra-Orthodox institution, having received her rabbinical degree in 2011, from Yeshiva Viznitz in South Fallsburg, N.Y. However, this was before she was openly transgender, and she is no longer working as a rabbi as of 2016. 
 2016: After four years of deliberation, Hebrew Union College-Jewish Institute of Religion decided to give women being ordained as rabbis a choice of wording on their ordination certificates beginning in 2016, including the option to have the same wording as men. Previously, male candidates' ordination certificates identified them by the Reform movement's traditional "morenu harav," or "our teacher the rabbi," while female candidates' certificates only used the term "rav u’morah," or "rabbi and teacher." 

 2017: Myriam Ackermann-Sommer studying to become France's first Orthodox female rabbi.
 2017: Esther Jonas Maertin, born in Leipzig, became the first person from Germany to have graduated from American Jewish University and been ordained by the Ziegler School of Rabbinics, Los Angeles. She is the first female rabbi in Leipzig and founder of "Beth Etz Chaim. Lehrhaus-Gemeinschaft-Teilhabe".
 2017: Nitzan Stein Kokin, who was German, became the first person to graduate from Zecharias Frankel College in Germany, which also made her the first Conservative rabbi to be ordained in Germany since before World War II.
 2017: Tiferet Berenbaum became the second black female rabbi of a congregation in the U.S., and possibly the world, after Alysa Stanton in 2009. Raised in a Southern Baptist family in Massachusetts, Berenbaum felt drawn to practice Jewish traditions in her youth. While at Tufts, she added a major in Judaic studies to her clinical psychology courseload, in 2013 receiving rabbinic ordination and a master's degree in Jewish education from Boston's transdenominational Hebrew College. On July 1, Berenbaum became the rabbi and educational director for Temple Har Zion in Mount Holly, N.J.
 2018: Dina Brawer, born in Italy but living in Britain, was ordained by Yeshivat Maharat and thus became Britain's first female Orthodox rabbi; she chose the title  "rabba", the feminine form of rabbi.
 2018: Lauren Tuchman was ordained at the Jewish Theological Seminary, becoming the first blind woman to enter the rabbinate. 
 2022: Irene Muzás Calpe, born in Spain and ordained in Germany, became the first female rabbi in Spain upon starting a job as a rabbi at the Atid synagogue in Barcelona.

See also 
 Timeline of women rabbis in the United States
 Women in Judaism

References

External links
 Women of Reform Judaism Executive Director: Rabbi Marla J. Feldman

rabbis
 
Judaism and women